The cinema of Egypt refers to the flourishing film industry based in Cairo, sometimes also referred to as Hollywood on the Nile. Since 1976, the capital has held the annual Cairo International Film Festival, which has been accredited by the International Federation of Film Producers Associations. There are an additional 12 festivals. Of the more than 4,000 short and feature-length films made in MENA region since 1908, more than three-quarters were Egyptian films. Egyptian films are typically spoken in the Egyptian Arabic dialect.

History

Beginnings

A limited number of silent films were made in Egypt beginning in 1896; 1927's Laila was notable as the first full-length feature. Cairo's film industry became a regional force with the coming of sound. Between 1930 and 1936, various small studios produced at least 44 feature films. In 1936, Studio Misr, financed by industrialist Talaat Harb, emerged as the leading Egyptian equivalent to Hollywood's major studios, a role the company retained for three decades.

Historians disagree in determining the beginning of cinema in Egypt. Some say in 1896, when the first film was watched in Egypt, while others date the beginning from 20 June 1907 with a short documentary film about the visit of Khedive Abbas Hilmi II to the Institute of Mursi Abul-Abbas in Alexandria. In 1917, the director Mohammed Karim established a production company in Alexandria. The company produced two films: Dead Flowers and Honor the Bedouin, which were shown in the city of Alexandria in early 1918.

Since then, more than 4,000 films have been produced in Egypt, three quarters of the total Arab production. Historian Samir Kassir notes (2004) that Misr Studios in particular, "despite their ups and downs, were to make Cairo the third capital of the world’s film industry, after Hollywood and Bombay but ahead of Italy’s Cinecittà." Egypt is the most productive country in the Middle East in the field of film production, and the one with the most developed media system.

The Golden Age

The 1940s, 1950s and the 1960s are generally considered the golden age of Egyptian cinema. In the 1950s, Egypt's cinema industry was the world's third largest. As in the West, films responded to the popular imagination, with most falling into predictable genres (happy endings being the norm), and many actors making careers out of playing strongly typed parts. In the words of one critic, "If an Egyptian film intended for popular audiences lacked any of these prerequisites, it constituted a betrayal of the unwritten contract with the spectator, the results of which would manifest themselves in the box office."

In 1940, the entrepreneur and translator Anis Ebeid established "Anis Ebeid Films", as the first subtitling company in Egypt and the rest of the Middle East, bringing hundreds of American and World movies to Egypt. Later he entered the movie distribution business too.

Political changes in Egypt after the overthrow of King Farouk in 1952 initially had little effect on Egyptian film. The Nasser regime sought control over the industry only after turning to socialism in 1961. By 1966, the Egyptian film industry had been nationalized. As with all matters in that period, diametrical opinions can be found about the cinema industry then. In the words of Ahmed Ramzi, a leading man of the era, "it went to the dogs". The "heavy government hand" that accompanied nationalization of Egyptian film "stifled innovative trends and sapped its dynamism". However, most of the 44 Egyptian films featuring in the best 100 Egyptian films list of all time were produced during that period. Notable titles includes; The Night of Counting The Years, Cairo Station, My Wife, the Director General, Saladin the Victorious, The Postman,  Back Again, Soft Hands, and The Land.

By the 1970s, Egyptian films struck a balance between politics and entertainment. Films such as 1972's Khalli Balak min Zouzou (Watch out for Zouzou), starring "the Cinderella of Arab cinema", Soad Hosny, sought to balance politics and audience appeal. Zouzou integrated music, dance, and contemporary fashions into a story that balanced campus ferment with family melodrama. Notable 1970s titles include; Sunset and Sunrise, Chitchat on the Nile, The Other Man, The Bullet is Still in My Pocket, Karnak, The Guilty, I Want a Solution, Whom Should We Shoot?, Alexandria... Why?, Shafika and Metwali. Hassan Ramzi's 1975 Egyptian film Al-Rida’ al-Abyad (The White Gown) was released in the Soviet Union in 1976, selling  tickets in the country. This made it the highest-grossing foreign film of the year and the seventh highest-grossing foreign film ever in the Soviet Union. This also made it the highest-grossing Egyptian film of all time, with its Soviet ticket sales surpassing the worldwide ticket sales of all other Egyptian films, achieving revenue over $28,700,000 in 1975.

Transitional period

The 1980s saw the Egyptian film industry in decline, however, the industry saw huge box-office jumps. In the 1980s, Egyptian cinema produced notable films, such as; The Shame, An Egyptian Story, The Bus Driver, The Peacock, The Innocent, The Collar and the Bracelet, A Moment of Weakness, The Wife of an Important Man,  and Escape. In the 1990s, However, with the rise of what came to be called "contractor movies". Actor Khaled El Sawy has described these as films "where there is no story, no acting and no production quality of any kind... basic formula movies that aimed at making a quick buck." the number of films produced also declined: from nearly 100 films a year in the industry's prime to about a dozen in 1995. This lasted until summer 1997, when "Ismailia Rayeh Gayy" (translation: Ismailia back and forth) shocked the cinema industry, enjoying unparalleled success and large profits for the producers, introducing Mohamed Fouad (a famous singer) and Mohamed Henedi, then a rather unknown actor who later became the number one comedian star. Building on the success of that movie, several comedy films were released in the following years. The 1990s notable titles include; the industry presented notable films such as; Alexandria Again and Forever, War in the Land of Egypt, The Kit Kat, The Shepherd and the Women, Terrorism and Kebab, The Terrorist, Five-Star Thieves, Road to Eilat, The Emigrant, Nasser 56, Destiny, Land of Fear, and The City.

Present
Since mid 1990s, Egypt's cinema has gone in separate directions. Smaller art films attract some international attention, but sparse attendance at home. Popular films, often broad comedies such as What A Lie!, and the extremely profitable works of comedian Mohamed Saad, battle to hold audiences either drawn to Western films or, increasingly, wary of the perceived immorality of film.

A few productions, such as 2003's Sahar el Layali (Sleepless Nights), intertwined stories of four bourgeois couples and 2006's Imarat Yacoubian (The Yacoubian Building) bridge this divide through their combination of high artistic quality and popular appeal.

In 2006, the film Awkat Faragh (Leisure Time) was released. A social commentary on the decline of Egyptian youth, the film was produced on a low budget and had attendant low production values. The film, however, became a success. Its controversial subject matter, namely, the sexual undertones in today's society, was seen as confirmation that the industry was beginning to take risks.

A major challenge facing Egyptian and international scholars, students and fans of Egyptian film is the lack of resources in terms of published works, preserved and available copies of the films themselves, and development in Egypt of state and private institutions dedicated to the study and preservation of film. The Egyptian National Film Centre (ENFC), which theoretically holds copies of all films made after 1961, is according to one Egyptian film researcher, "far from being a library, houses piles of rusty cans containing positive copies."

The year 2007, however, saw a considerable spike in the number of Egyptian films made. In 1997, the number of Egyptian feature-length films created was 16; 10 years later, that number had risen to 40. Box office records have also risen significantly, as Egyptian films earned around $50 million.

Festivals

Since 1952, Cairo has held The Catholic Center film festival. It is the oldest film festival in the Middle East and Africa. It is specialized in Egyptian Cinema. Since 1976, Cairo has held the annual Cairo International Film Festival, which has been accredited by the International Federation of Film Producers Associations. Other film festivals are held in Egypt including:

 Luxor African Film Festival
 Aswan International Women's Film Festival
 Cairo International Women's Film Festival
 Alexandria International Film Festival
 El Gouna Film Festival
 Cairo Cinema Days
 National Egyptian Film Festival
 Cairo Francophone Film Festival
 Catholic Center Film Festival
 Port Said Festival for Arab Films
 Film Association Festival for Egyptian Cinema
 Sharm El-Sheikh Film Festival
 Ismailia International Film Festival for Documentaries and Shorts

Notable films

Notable figures

Directors

 Ahmed Badrakhan (1909–1969)
 Anwar Wagdi (1904–1955)
 Atef E-Taieb (1947–1995)
 Daoud Abdel Sayed (1946–)
 Ezz El-Dine Zulficar (1919–1963)
 Hassan El-Imam (1919–1988)
 Henry Barakat (1912–1997)
 Hussein Kamal (1932–2003)
 Jehane Noujaim (1974–)
 Karim Diaa El-Din (1946-2021)
 Khairy Beshara (1947–)
 Maher Sabry (1967–)
 Mahmoud Zulfikar (1914–1970)
 Marwan Hamed (1970–)
 Mohamed Khan (1942–2016)
 Mohammed Karim (1896–1972)
 Salah Abu Seif (1915–1996)
 Shady Abdel Salam (1930–1986)
 Sherif Arafa (1960–)
 Tamer El Said (1972–)
 Yousry Nasrallah (1952–)
 Youssef Chahine (1926–2008)
 Youssef Wahbi (1898–1982)

Cinematographers
 Wahid Farid (1919-1998)
 Tarek El-Telmissany (1950–)

Actors and actresses

 Abdelhalim Hafez (El Andaleeb) (1929–1977)
 Adel Emam (1940–)
 Ahmed El Sakka (1973–)
 Ahmed Ezz (1971–)
 Ahmed Helmy (1969–)
 Ahmed Mazhar (1917–2002) 
 Ahmad Zaki (1949–2005) 
 Amina Rizk (1910–2003) 
 Anwar Wagdi (1904–1955) 
 Elham Shahin (1961–)
 Emad Hamdy (1909–1984) 
 Ezzat El Alaili (1934–2021)
 Ezz El-Dine Zulficar (1919–1963) 
 Farid al-Atrash (1915–1974) 
 Farid Shawky (1920–1998) 
 Farouk al-Fishawy (1952–2019)
 Faten Hamama (1931–2015) 
 Fuad Al Mohandes (El Ostaz) (1924–2006) 
 Hend Rostom (1929–2011)
 Hussein El Imam (1951-2014)
 Hussein Fahmy (1940–)
 Ismail Yasin (1912–1972)
 Khaled Abol Naga (1966–)
 Laila Elwi (1962–)
 Layla Murad (1918–1995)
 Laila Taher (1942–)
 Lebleba (1945–)
 Madiha Yousri (1921–2018)
 Magda (1931–2020)
 Mahmoud Abdel Aziz (1946–2016)
 Mahmoud Yassin (1941–2020)
 Mahmoud Zulfikar (1914-1970)
 Mariam Fakhr Eddine (1933–2014)
 Mary Queeny (1913–2003)
 Mervat Amin (1946–)
 Mohamed Abdel Wahab (1902–1991)
 Mohamed Henedi (1965–)
 Mona Zaki (1976–)
 Mounira El Mahdeya (1885–1965)
 Nabila Ebeid (1945–)
 Nadia Al-Gindi (1946–)
 Nadia Lutfi (1937–2020)
 Nagat El-Sagheera (1938–)
 Naglaa Fathi (1951–)
 Naguib Al Rihani (1889–1949)
 Naima Akef (1932–1966)
 Nelly Mazloum (1929–2003)
 Nour El-Sherif (1946–2015)
 Omar Sharif (1932–2015)
 Poussi (1953–)
 Rushdy Abaza (1926–1980)
 Sabah (1921–2014)
 Safia El Emari (1949–)
 Salah Zulfikar (1926–1993)
 Samia Gamal (1924–1994)
 Samir Ghanem (1937–2021)
 Sanaa Gamil (1932–2002) 
 Shadia (1929–2017)
 Shukry Sarhan (1925–1997)
 Shwikar (1939–2020)
 Soad Hosny (1943–2001)
 Soher Al Bably (1937–)
 Tahiya Carioca (1920–1999)
 Youssef Wahbi (1898–1982)
 Yousuf Shaaban (1931–2021)
 Yousra (1955–)
 Zaki Rostom (1903–1972)

Film critics
 Samir Farid (1943–2017)

Music Composers
 Ammar El Sherei (1948–2012)
Ali Ismael (1922-1974)
Fouad Al-Zahery (1916-1988)
Moody El Imam (1957-)
 Omar Khairat (1948–present)
 Hesham Nazih (1972-present)

See also

 Culture of Egypt
 CIFF Top 100 Egyptian films
 Lists of Egyptian films

In the press
 The best of Egyptian cinema, the best 15 best Egyptian films of all time

References

Further reading
 Viola Shafik, Popular Egyptian Cinema: Gender, Class, and Nation, American University in Cairo Press, 2007, 
  Walter Armbrust, "Political Film in Egypt" in: Josef Gugler (ed.) Film in the Middle East and North Africa: Creative Dissidence, University of Texas Press and American University in Cairo Press, 2011, pp 228–251

External links
 African Media Program Comprehensive database of African media
 El-Cinema.com (an IMDb inspired Egyptian/Arabic movie database)

 
Egyptian culture